Ilemela District is one of the seven districts of the Mwanza Region of Tanzania with a postcode number 33200.  It is bordered to the north and west by Lake Victoria, to the east by Magu District, and to the south by Nyamagana District. Part of the region's capital, the town of Mwanza, is within Ilemela District. The district commission's office is located in Buswelu area of Mwanza town.

In 2016 the Tanzania National Bureau of Statistics report there were 386,361 people in the district, from 343,001 in 2012.

Mwanza International Airport is located in Ilemela District.

Geography

Administrative subdivisions 
The district is divided into nineteen wards.

 Bugogwa
 Buswelu
 Buzuruga
 Ilemela Ward
 Ibungilo
 Kawekamo
 Kahama (Ilemela)
 Kayenze
 Kirumba
 Kitangiri
 Mecco
 Nyakato
 Nyamanoro
 Nyamongoro
 Nyasaka
 Pasiansi
 Sangabuye
 Shibula
 Kiseke

References

 
Districts of Mwanza Region